Margareta Hasbjörnsdatter or Margareta Asbjørnsdatter (11th century) was Queen consort of Denmark as the spouse of King Harald III.

Margareta was the daughter of jarl Asbjörn Ulfsen, possibly an uncle of her spouse; she would thereby have been her husband's cousin. No children are known from the marriage. The dates of her birth and death are unknown.

A DNA test in 2003 dispelled the centuries-old legend that Estrid Svendsdatter was buried in the northeastern pier of the Roskilde Cathedral. The new theory is that the sign on the pier refers to Margareta Hasbjörnsdatter, who was also known as Estrid.

Literature
 Henning Dehn-Nielsen: Kings and Queens of Denmark. Kopenhaga: 2007. .
 Kay Nielsen, Ib Askholm: Danmarks kongelige familier i 1000 år. 2007. .

References 

	

11th-century births
Year of death unknown
Danish royal consorts
11th-century Danish women
11th-century Danish people